The Scioto Grange No. 1234, in Jackson, Ohio, served historically as a meeting hall, as a school, and as a specialty store.  It was listed on the National Register of Historic Places in 2005.

It was built by the Scioto Grange No. 1234, a chapter of the Grange, in 1897, the year of founding of the chapter.  It was a schoolhouse from 1917 to 1935.  Part of the building served as a community store from 1907 to 1937.

References

External links
Photo and info, at Flickr

Clubhouses on the National Register of Historic Places in Ohio
Buildings and structures in Jackson County, Ohio
National Register of Historic Places in Jackson County, Ohio
Grange organizations and buildings in Ohio
Grange buildings on the National Register of Historic Places